Sam Aubrey (June 15, 1922 – May 5, 2008) was the head coach of the Oklahoma State University men's basketball team between 1970 and 1973.  Aubrey was the starting forward for the 1946 NCAA men's basketball champions, Oklahoma A&M University under coach Henry Iba.

Early years, playing career, and military service
Aubrey was born in Sapulpa, Oklahoma, and attended Tulsa Central High School. He enrolled at Oklahoma A&M and was offered a partial scholarship by coach Iba. He won a letter as a sophomore for the 1941-42 Oklahoma A&M basketball team that won the Missouri Valley Conference championship. As a junior for the 1942-43 team, he again won a varsity letter as a guard.

Aubrey then enlisted in the Army and won a Silver Star for valor in combat during the Arno-Po campaign in Italy. He also received a Purple Heart after he was shot in the back in September 1944, with the bullet exiting near the front of his left hip. The wound resulted in extensive injuries, including destruction of the large muscle in his left hip, an inability to walk for two months, a cast from his waist down, and a lengthy hospitalization.

After the war, Aubrey returned to Oklahoma A&M and, despite his injuries, returned to the basketball team less than a year after being shot. He started every for the 1945–46 Oklahoma A&M Aggies men's basketball team that won the NCAA championship.

Coaching career
After graduating from Oklahoma A&M in 1946, Aubrey began coaching basketball. He began as the basketball coach at Pryor High School, compiling a 46-29 in three years in that post. He then coached for four years at Oklahoma Tech where he compiled a record of 67-52.

He returned to Oklahoma A&M as the freshman coach in 1953. In 10 seasons as freshman coach, he compiled a record of 62-18. He then became a full-time assistant coach in 1964.
 
After serving for 16 years as an assistant under Iba, Aubrey succeeded Iba as head coach in February 1970. However, he resigned after winning only 18 games in three seasons, including only seven in Big Eight play.

Death
Aubrey died in May 2008 at a retirement center in Stillwater.

References

1922 births
2008 deaths
Basketball coaches from Oklahoma
Basketball players from Oklahoma
Forwards (basketball)
High school basketball coaches in Oklahoma
Junior college men's basketball coaches in the United States
Oklahoma State Cowboys basketball players
Oklahoma State Cowboys basketball coaches
Sportspeople from Tulsa, Oklahoma